Leary School of Alexandria, Virginia, is one of two campuses operated by the Lincolnia Educational Foundation, Inc., a non-public, non-profit organization. The other campus is located in Oxon Hill, Maryland. The Leary Schools are special schools that together serve over 200 students with emotional, behavioral and learning problems annually. Timber Ridge School, a residential treatment center in Cross Junction, Virginia, exists for boys age 10-17 requiring treatment in a 24-hour-a-day environment.

External links
http://www.learyschool.org Leary Schools Home
http://www.timber-ridge-school.org Timber Ridge School Home

Schools in Alexandria, Virginia
Educational institutions established in 1964
Special schools in the United States
Private high schools in Virginia
Private middle schools in Virginia
Private elementary schools in Virginia
1964 establishments in Virginia
Residential treatment centers